The short-tailed river stingray (Potamotrygon brachyura) is a species of river stingray (family Potamotrygonidae) native to the Río de la Plata Basin in South America. It is sometimes known as the giant freshwater stingray, but this name is typically used for the southeast Asian Himantura polylepis.

The largest specimen on record is 2.0m (6ft 6") in diameter and estimated to weigh 300 kg (660lbs). This short-tailed river stingray was caught on rod and line in October 2022 by British angler - Greg Iszatt from the Parana River, Argentina, and took over 9 hours and 20 minutes to land. Greg Iszatt was assisted by Thomas Armitage and James Frankland. This fish is the unofficial All-Tackle World Record for the species.The primary threat to the short-tailed river stingray is fishing for food and as a game fish, but it is also under pressure from habitat loss and occasionally caught for aquaria.

Description
The short-tailed river stingray is circular in shape and humped in the back. They have a dark pattern on their backs, probably used as camouflage. The ray's tail is very muscular and thick, covered with short spines at the base and a venomous sting at the end.

Distribution 
The short-tailed river stingray is found in the Río de la Plata Basin, including the Paraguay, Paraná and Uruguay Rivers in the countries of Argentina, Brazil, Paraguay and Uruguay. It may also range into Bolivia in the Pilcomayo River (a tributary of the Paraguay River), but this remains unconfirmed. In the north it ranges from the upper Paraguay River basin, including the Pantanal, and south to the lowermost freshwater sections of the Río de la Plata. Unlike some other freshwater rays, it has not been able to spread to the upper Paraná River basin after the Itaipu Dam flooded the Guaíra Falls, which represented a natural barrier to its range.

Lifestyle
Female short-tailed river stingrays give birth to up to 19 fully formed young stingrays per litter. The pups start off eating plankton and then move on to consume small mollusks, crustaceans, the larvae of aquatic insects, and fish.

References

External links
 Species description of Potamotrygon brachyura at www.shark-references.com

brachyura
Freshwater fish of Argentina
Freshwater fish of Brazil
Fish of Paraguay
Fish of Uruguay
Fauna of the Pantanal
Fish described in 1880
Taxa named by Albert Günther